The Autostrada A27 is an Italian motorway which connects the city of Mestre to Pian di Vedoia, a frazione of Ponte nelle Alpi.

References

Buildings and structures completed in 1972
Autostrade in Italy
Transport in Veneto